

83001–83100 

|-bgcolor=#f2f2f2
| colspan=4 align=center | 
|}

83101–83200 

|-bgcolor=#f2f2f2
| colspan=4 align=center | 
|}

83201–83300 

|-bgcolor=#f2f2f2
| colspan=4 align=center | 
|}

83301–83400 

|-id=360
| 83360 Catalina || 2001 SH || Catalina Sky Survey is one of the most successful programs discovering minor planets. It began operations in April 1998, with prominence given to the search of near-Earth object. The program utilizes a 0.76-m Schmidt telescope located on Mt. Bigelow in the Catalina Mountains north of Tucson, Arizona. || 
|-id=362
| 83362 Sandukruit ||  || Sanduk Ruit (born 1954) is a visionary Nepalese ophthalmologist who founded the Tilganga Eye Centre in Kathmandu. He also created the Himalayan Cataract Project, which had cured hundreds of thousands of cataract patients in poor countries || 
|-id=363
| 83363 Yamwingwah ||  || Vivian Wing-Wah Yam (Yam Wing Wah, born 1963) is a chemistry professor at the University of Hong Kong. Her research interests are optoelectronic materials, photochromic and photoswitching materials. She won the 13th L´Oréal-UNESCO Women in Science Awards 2011 || 
|}

83401–83500 

|-id=464
| 83464 Irishmccalla ||  || Irish McCalla (1929–2002) was an American film actress and artist. She produced over 1000 paintings and numerous limited-edition lithographs. She was a member of Woman Artists of the American West. Her art often featured themes from the Old West and the sweet innocence of youth. || 
|}

83501–83600 

|-id=598
| 83598 Aiweiwei ||  || Ai Weiwei (born 1957) is a Chinese artist and architectural designer. His most famous design was the Beijing National Stadium, more commonly called the Bird's Nest, the main stadium of the 2008 Olympic Games in Beijing || 
|-id=600
| 83600 Yuchunshun ||  || Yu Chunshun (1951–1996) was a Chinese adventurer. He died in the Lop Nur desert in Xinjiang province, People's Republic of China. || 
|}

83601–83700 

|-id=657
| 83657 Albertosordi ||  || Alberto Sordi (1920–2003) was an Italian actor, director, comedian, screenwriter, composer, singer and songwriter. || 
|}

83701–83800 

|-bgcolor=#f2f2f2
| colspan=4 align=center | 
|}

83801–83900 

|-bgcolor=#f2f2f2
| colspan=4 align=center | 
|}

83901–84000 

|-id=956
| 83956 Panuzzo ||  || Pasquale Panuzzo (born 1972), an Italian astronomer working for the development of the SPIRE instrument of ESA's Herschel mission. His research interests are population synthesis models for dusty galaxies, H II regions, star formation, the ages of early-type galaxies and Spitzer data. || 
|-id=982
| 83982 Crantor ||  || Crantor, a Lapith killed by the centaur Demoleon in Greek mythology || 
|}

References 

083001-084000